Quintalia flosculus is an extinct species of air-breathing land snail or semislug, a terrestrial pulmonate gastropod mollusk in the family Helicarionidae. This species was endemic to Norfolk Island.

References
 

Quintalia
Extinct gastropods
Gastropods described in 1866
Taxonomy articles created by Polbot
Taxa named by James Charles Cox